Juni Lake is a lake in Brown County, Minnesota, in the United States. The lake is a  protected body of water.

History
Juni Lake was named for Benedict Juni, a Swiss settler.

See also
 List of lakes of Minnesota
List of fishes of Minnesota

References

External links
Juni Lake Topographical map

Lakes of Minnesota
Lakes of Brown County, Minnesota